Parameters
Josefina Wikberg (born July 8, 1982) is a Swedish adventure racer and ski mountaineer. She is a member of the Swedish National Teams in both sports. In 2014, she placed second in the two-day Keb Classic with teammates Charlotte Kalla, multiple cross-country World and Olympic Champion, and Emelie Forsberg, three-time Skyrunner World Series winner in the Ultra discipline.

Forsberg has won the Vértex Vinter solo event twice and the duo event also three times.

References

External links
 
 
 Adventure Racing World Series
 International Ski Mountaineering website

1982 births
Living people
Swedish female ski mountaineers
Swedish female long-distance runners